Valerian may refer to:

Arts and entertainment 
 a fictional character in Valérian and Laureline, a comics series
Valerian and the City of a Thousand Planets, a film adaptation of the comic series
 an early pseudonym for Gary Numan (b. 1958), a musician
 a fictional race in "Dramatis Personae" (Star Trek: Deep Space Nine)
 an arms manufacturer in On the Frontier, a play published in 1938

People 
 Valerian (name), including a list of people with the given name and surname
 Valerian (emperor), Roman emperor from 253 to 260

Plants
 Valerian (herb), Valeriana officinalis, a medicinal plant, and the namesake for other valerians.
 other plants in the genus Valeriana
 Centranthus, a genus containing plants closely related to Valeriana

Ships 
 HMS Valerian (1916)

See also
 
 Valeria (disambiguation)
 Valerianus (disambiguation)
 Valérien (disambiguation)
 Valyrian languages, in the fiction of George R. R. Martin
 Sweet Valerian, a series of manga and anime episodes